Richard (Dick) Ferguson QC, SC (22 August 1935 – 26 July 2009) was a barrister and politician from Northern Ireland.

Background
Born in Derrygonnelly, County Fermanagh, the son of a sergeant in the Royal Ulster Constabulary, Ferguson attended Rainey Endowed School and Methodist College. He later studied law at Trinity College Dublin and Queen's University, Belfast. He was called to the Bar in Northern Ireland in 1956 and later still in the Republic of Ireland, and from 1972, in England.

Political career

Although he rapidly established a reputation as one of the jurisdiction's ablest young advocates, in 1968 Ferguson was elected to the Parliament of Northern Ireland for the Ulster Unionist Party, representing South Antrim.  He was considered a liberal Unionist and was a supporter of the Prime Minister Terence O'Neill.
 Before his election, he had called for local government reform including a one man, one vote system.   O'Neill in his autobiography praised Ferguson as 'the most liberal supporter I had'.

Ferguson held his seat at the 1969 general election. In August, he resigned from the Orange Order, and was subsequently subject to intimidation. He stood down from Parliament in 1970 alongside O'Neill, citing ill health. In April, his house in Lisburn was firebombed in an attack blamed on loyalists.

Legal career
In 1971, Ferguson joined the Alliance Party of Northern Ireland but did not continue in an active political role. Instead, he focused on law, becoming a Queen's Counsel (QC) in Northern Ireland in 1973 and chairing the Northern Ireland Mental Health Review Tribunal from 1973 until 1984. He departed Northern Ireland in 1983 and became a Senior Counsel, before moving to London in 1986 where he became a QC in England. From 1993 until 1995, he served as the Chair of the Criminal Bar Association.

He was defence counsel in many high-profile cases, such as those of mass-murderers Rosemary West and Patrick Magee, and successfully defended two British soldiers accused of war crimes in Iraq. By 2003, he was the top-earning criminal defence barrister, with more than £800,000 in that year.

In an obituary it was noted that he represented "property tycoon Nicholas Van Hoogstraten, Richard Branson of Virgin, Afghan airplane hijackers, the Birmingham Six, Guinness boss Ernest Saunders and boxer Terry Marsh....he regretted, he once said, not having the chance to defend Michael Jackson."

Death notification
Ferguson died after heart surgery on 26 July 2009, aged 73, and was buried on the eastern side of Highgate Cemetery. He is survived by his second wife, Roma (née Whelan), a barrister, and their son; and by his first wife, Janet (née Magowan), and their four children.

References

External links
 Ferguson obituary in The Times Online
 Ferguson obituary in The Telegraph

1935 births
2009 deaths
Burials at Highgate Cemetery
Alliance Party of Northern Ireland politicians
Alumni of Queen's University Belfast
Alumni of Trinity College Dublin
Members of the House of Commons of Northern Ireland 1965–1969
Members of the House of Commons of Northern Ireland 1969–1973
Politicians from County Fermanagh
20th-century King's Counsel
21st-century King's Counsel
Ulster Unionist Party members of the House of Commons of Northern Ireland
Place of death missing
People educated at Rainey Endowed School
People educated at Methodist College Belfast
Members of the House of Commons of Northern Ireland for County Antrim constituencies
Irish Senior Counsel